Prince Ari'imate Teururai later known as King Tamatoa VI (1853 – 15 September 1905), was a member of a Tahitian royal family, the House of Teururai which reigned on the Tahitian island of Huahiné and Maia'o during the 19th century.

He was installed as king of Ra'iatea and Taha'a in 1884, but was deposed in 1888.

Biography
Prince Ariimate Teururai was born at Huahine in 1853.
He was the last King of Ra'iatea and Taha'a. He was the second son of King Ari'imate of Huahine. His mother, Princess Maerehia Tehaapapa of Raiatea, was the only living child of King Tamatoa IV of Ra'iatea. She became Queen regnant of Huahine under the regnal name of Tehaapapa II after her husband was deposed in 1868.

Heir to the Raiatea and Tahaa kingdom 
He was installed as king of Ra'iatea and Taha'a in 1884. His coronation took place on January 22, 1885. He took the regnal name Tamatoa VI.

His reign ended when the French annexed the two islands of Ra'iatea and Taha'a on March 16, 1888.

After his abdication, he returned to his natal island where he was later proclaimed chief of Tefarerii in Huahine island on 1895, the same year that his niece Queen Tehaapapa III was deposed.

Marriage and children 
He married Tetua-nui Ha'amarurai a Tati (daughter of Tamatoa Atiti-Oroi, of the Tati family of Papara) and had three sons and three daughters:

 Crown Prince Tamatoa of Raiatea and Taha'a.
 Prince Opuhara Pehupehu Teururai.
 Princess Tevahineha'amo'eatua Teururai.
 Princess Teri'imanaiterai Teururai.
 Prince Mahine Ta'aroari'i Teururai.
 Prince Tefauvero Teururai.

Their children remain the pretenders to the royal family of Raiatea and Taha'a since the end of the monarchy on this island.

He died at Huahine in 1905.

Ancestry

See also
 List of monarchs of Tahiti
 French Polynesia
 List of monarchs who lost their thrones in the 19th century (Rai'atea)

External links 

1853 births
1905 deaths
Tahitian monarchs
French Polynesian royalty
Oceanian monarchs
Huahine royalty
People from Raiatea